Katia Piccolini was the defending champion, but lost in the first round to Maja Živec-Škulj.

Magdalena Maleeva won the title by defeating Federica Bonsignori 7–6(7–3), 6–4 in the final.

Seeds

Draw

Finals

Top half

Bottom half

References

External links
 Official results archive (ITF)
 Official results archive (WTA)

WTA San Marino
WTA San Marino